Agios Pavlos, Saint Paul, is a suburb of the Thessaloniki Urban Area and a former municipality. Since the 2011 local government reform it is part of the municipality of Neapoli-Sykies, of which it is a municipal unit. The 2011 census recorded 6,852 people in Agios Pavlos. The municipal unit of Agios Pavlos covers an area of 1.953 km2.

People
Giorgos Koudas, football player

See also
 List of settlements in the Thessaloniki regional unit

References

Populated places in Thessaloniki (regional unit)
Paul the Apostle